This article lists the largest active privately owned single-masted monohulls in excess of 130ft (39.6m) in overall sparred length.

Parameter list
Name: currently registered identification of the vessel
Year: year of launch of the vessel
Shipyard: signatory of the build contract responsible for the final fitout and the delivery of the vessel
Designer: naval architect responsible for drawing the lines plan and the sail plan of the vessel
LOA: overall sparred length in metres
LWL: load waterline length in metres
Beam: width of the vessel in metres
Draught: draught of the vessel in metres (minimum draft of lifting keels in parentheses)
Air draught: masthead height in metres
Sail Area: summed upwind surface area of mainsail and headsails in square metres
Displacement: displaced volume of water, upright, at rest, in metric tonnes
Hull material: build material of the hull
Propulsion: number of engines and their power in kilowatts

Fleet in navigation

See also
List of schooners
List of large sailing yachts

References
Superyacht Times - list of sailing yachts
Lists of individual sailing yachts
Sloops